Rekwoi is a former Yurok settlement in Del Norte County, California, 1 mi (1.6 km) upstream from Requa. It lay at an elevation of 10 feet (3 m).

References

External links

Yurok villages
Former settlements in Del Norte County, California
Former Native American populated places in California
National Register of Historic Places in Del Norte County, California
National Register of Historic Places in Redwood National and State Parks